Joseph Planta GCH (2 July 1787 – 5 April 1847) was a British diplomat and politician of Romansh-Swiss descent. He was the MP for Hastings, England.

Planta's father, also named Joseph Planta (1744–1827), moved from Switzerland to England and became the Principal Librarian of the British Museum in London. He was born at the British Museum and educated at Eton College.

Planta became a clerk at the Foreign Office and was Private Secretary to George Canning. In 1813–14, he was Secretary to Robert Stewart, Viscount Castlereagh, during his mission to the allied sovereigns. He was the Parliamentary Under-Secretary of State for Foreign Affairs from 25 July 1817 to 22 January 1822. He was also the Permanent Under-Secretary of State for Foreign Affairs from 1817.

He was the Senior Secretary to the Treasury during the Canningite Government of 1827–1828 and the Tory Government of 1828–1830. He was made a member of the Privy council in 1834. He was made a Lord of the Treasury on 21 November 1834 in the Conservative Provisional Government of 1834.

He was elected Conservative Member of Parliament for Hastings in southern England, in 1827 and 1830. He was defeated in 1835, but then re-elected in 1837, and again in 1841.

Honours
He was knighted with the Grand Cross of the Hanoverian Guelphic Order (GCH).

References

1787 births
1847 deaths
Politicians from London
People educated at Eton College
Diplomats from London
People from Hastings
Conservative Party (UK) MPs for English constituencies
UK MPs 1826–1830
UK MPs 1830–1831
UK MPs 1841–1847
British people of Swiss descent
People associated with the British Museum
Members of the Privy Council of the United Kingdom
British people of Romansh descent
Tory MPs (pre-1834)
Joseph